Princeps namque was one of the Usages of Barcelona which regulate the defense of the prince and Principality of Catalonia, and the organising of its military forces.  Included in the first Usages of the 11th Century, it was explicitly included in the Usages until the end of the 16th Century.

The term Princeps namque is derived from the first two words, in Latin, of Ustage 68 (although in some compilations it is number 69): 
If the prince for any reason is besieged, or has his enemies besieged, or hears of a coming king or prince...

See also
Constitucions Catalanes
Usages of Barcelona
Sagramental

References

Conscription by country
Medieval legal codes
County of Barcelona 
Legal history of Spain